This list is of Japanese structures dating from the Taishō period (1912–1926) that have been designated Important Cultural Properties. As of October 2016, ninety-six properties with two hundred and twenty-seven component structures have been so designated.

Structures

See also

 Cultural Properties of Japan
 List of Important Cultural Properties of Japan (Shōwa period: structures)

References

Taishō period
Important Cultural Properties of Japan
Architecture in Japan